The following lists events that happened during 2011 in Cambodia.

Incumbents 
 Monarch: Norodom Sihamoni 
 Prime Minister: Hun Sen

Events

January
 January 25 - Around 2,000 "green shirt" protesters in Thailand demonstrate over the government's handling of a border dispute with Cambodia.
 January 31 - Nuon Chea and Khieu Samphan, two of the most senior surviving leaders of the Khmer Rouge, appear in a Cambodian court to request release from pre-trial detention.

February
 February 5 - A Thai soldier is shot dead and four wounded in clashes with Cambodian troops in a disputed border area.
 February 6 - Cambodia says a disputed 11th century temple has been damaged on the third day of cross border clashes with Thailand.
 February 7 - Clashes occur between Thai and Cambodian forces near the Preah Vihear Temple.

March
 March 16 - Police in Cambodia ask prosecutors to charge recruitment firm T&P with illegally detaining its staff.

April
 April 22 - Cambodia and Thailand exchange fire across their mutual border; with casualties on both sides.
 April 23 - Cambodia and Thailand clash on their border again.
 April 25 - Cambodian and Thai troops exchange fire for a fourth consecutive day.
 April 27 - Troops from Thailand and Cambodia exchange gunfire for the sixth straight day as the death toll from the conflict during the period reaches fourteen.
 April 28 - Thailand announces that it will send more troops to its border with Cambodia after a seventh day of fighting near the disputed Preah Vihear Temple that has killed 15 people.
 April 30 - Thai and Cambodian troops exchange gunfire near the Ta Krabei temple in Oddar Meanchey Province marking the ninth straight day of border clashes.

May
 May 12 - A former Cambodian prosecutor is jailed for 19 years on charges of corruption in the first case brought by the country's new anti-corruption unit.

June
 June 27 - A United Nations-backed tribunal in Cambodia holds its first hearings in the trial of four former senior Khmer Rouge officials, including former head of state Khieu Samphan and Pol Pot's deputy Nuon Chea.

September
 September 15 - The Prime Minister of Thailand Yingluck Shinawatra visits Cambodia in an effort to improve relations after the border clashes near the Preah Vihear Temple earlier this year which led to the deaths of twenty people.
 September 17 - Former Prime Minister of Thailand Thaksin Shinawatra visits Cambodia for high-level talks with the government of Cambodia over a variety of issues, including the ownership of the disputed Preah Vihear Temple.

November
 November 21 - The trial begins of the three most senior surviving members of Cambodia's Khmer Rouge regime, on charges of genocide and crimes against humanity.

December
 December 13 - Three Thai soldiers are killed by a land mine near the border with Cambodia.

References

 
Years of the 21st century in Cambodia
Cambodia
2010s in Cambodia
Cambodia